European route E 56 is a road part of the International E-road network. It begins in Nuremberg, Germany and ends in Sattledt, Austria.

The road follows: Nuremberg - Regensburg - Deggendorf - Passau - Ried - Wels - Sattledt. 

56
056
E056